Michael Kindo (28 June 1946 – 31 December 2020) was an Indian field hockey player from the tribal belt of Jharkhand. He played at full back defender position and represented India and competed in the 1971 Men's Hockey World Cup, 1972 Summer Olympics, 1973 Men's Hockey World Cup, 1974 Asian Games, 1975 Men's Hockey World Cup. Prior to this he had competed in several local, national and regional competitions. In 1972, he became the first Adivasi sportsperson to be awarded the prestigious Arjuna Award.

Michael was well known for his tackling and dodging skills. He was considered a pioneer in Indian hockey for his no-look pass. According to many of his colleagues, Michael had a clean tackling technique, covered areas well and was a master of ball distribution, which allowed the forwards to play fearlessly. He did the right move at the right time, said former team India captain Ajit Pal Singh. He was known as one of the most dependable team players and was almost never in error in the field. Hockey enthusiasts and his team members frequently remark that Michael was a genuine team player who made solid defense an art form.

Early life
Michael Kindo was born into a poor Oraon tribal family, in a small village known as Baighma, in Bihar (present-day Jharkhand) on 28 June 1946. He first picked up the hockey stick at RC Boys Middle School in Kurdeg and then moved to St Mary´s High school, run by Jesuits in Simdega. He polished his skills and techniques of hockey very much as a professional under guidance in this school.  After he finished his schooling he joined the Indian Navy.

Career

Domestic career
Michael's career took a serious turn when he joined the navy. In his time in the navy, he got selected for and represented the Services hockey team in the national championships from 1966 to 1973. He won the Best Services Sportsman award in 1971.

International career
Kindo made his international debut in 1969 representing team India in a test series against Kenya. He was a member of the Indian men's field hockey team in the 1972 Munich Olympics, winning the Bronze medal. He had played in all of the first three world cups. They won Bronze medal in the 1971 world cup; Silver in the 1973 world cup and Gold in the 1975 world cup. He also represented India in field hockey at the 1974 Tehran Asian games.

In the 1975 world cup, Michael injured his ankle and was substituted with Aslam Sher Khan in the semi-finals against Malaysia. Khan's efforts dragged India into the finals and Kindo lost his spot in the starting 11 against Pakistan in the final match. The ankle injury denied him a place at the 1976 Montreal Olympics, but Michael shortly quit his international career after the team's dismal performance brought India down to 7th place.

Later Work
Michael joined SAIL hockey at Rourkela in and represented Odisha state in the nationals from 1978 to 1980. He used to hold tournaments for children in his village in Jharkhand. Michael was also a State Team Selector for Odisha in the 1993 Bikaner national championship. He coached hockey at the SAIL Hockey Academy (SHA) at Rourkela, and was responsible for the installment of an artificial turf at the academy.

Retirement and legacy
Kindo quietly retired into his Rourkela home, where he lived with his wife and his son's family. In 2010, when he came to the Delhi world cup, he was put through ordinary security checks, unrecognizable by anybody in the crowd. Michael supported the 2011 merger of Hockey India and the Indian Hockey Federation. In the 2012 Olympics, he was upset seeing India's performance at London, Michael criticized and demanded immediate removal of coach Nobbs.

Michael Kindo died on the 31st of December, 2020 at Ispat General hospital due to age-related illnesses. According to his family, he was bedridden for quite some time and was suffering from depression. On Thursday, the 1st of January, 2021, his body was brought from the morgue to the Rourkela hockey stadium for the public to pay their respects and was also bestowed upon with the Guard of Honour by the district police. His body was then taken to Hamirpur church and was laid to rest in the church graveyard.

Michael Kindo still remains a tribal icon who instilled the aspiration of tribal hockey all over Gumla-Sundergarh tribal belt. This region is considered a conveyer belt of hockey players today. Former Team India captain and a student of Michael's, Dilip Tirkey said that the 2023 World Cup being hosted in Rourkela was made possible by Kindo. According to Tirkey, even though Michael stopped playing decades ago, he never left his association with hockey. Kindo's colleagues from the 1975 gold team used to call him as kindi bhai; they say that he never let the team's spirit go down. Among his team members, he was known as the gentleman defender who was calm-headed, clean-hearted and simple but was very effective in game. According to Ajit Pal, "We were an attacking side and a lot of us could do that fearlessly because we knew there were players like Michael defending our goal". Michael was one of the first tribals to represent independent India and is the only one to win a world cup. In his honor still today a famous hockey tournament is run by St Mary´s School  in the district of Simdega, known as ´Michael Tournament´.

Laurels
List of all medals won and awards received
 Best Services Sportsman award — 1971
 Third place, Barcelona Men's Hockey World Cup — 1971
 3rd position (Bronze), Munich Summer Olympics — 1972
 Arjuna Award — 1972
 Runner-up, Amstelveen Men's Hockey World Cup — 1973
 2nd position (Silver), Tehran Asian Games — 1974
 Winner, Kuala Lumpur Men's Hockey World Cup — 1975
Source: Times of India, Stick2Hockey

References

External links 
 
 
 
 

1946 births
2020 deaths
People from Simdega district
People from Rourkela
Field hockey players from Jharkhand
Field hockey players from Odisha
Recipients of the Arjuna Award
Field hockey players at the 1972 Summer Olympics
Indian male field hockey players
Olympic medalists in field hockey
Olympic field hockey players of India
Medalists at the 1972 Summer Olympics
Olympic bronze medalists for India